Berlyn Dale Horne (April 12, 1899 – February 3, 1983) was a relief pitcher in Major League Baseball who played briefly for the Chicago Cubs during the 1929 season. Listed at 5' 9", 155 lb., Horne was a switch-hitter and threw right-handed. He was born in Bachman, Ohio.

In his one season in the majors, Horne posted a 1–1 record with a 5.09 ERA in 11 appearances, including one start, six strikeouts, 21 walks, 24 hits allowed, and 23 innings of work without a save. However, Horne's minor league baseball career spanned 22 seasons from 1917 to 1938, including several seasons in the Pacific Coast League. He won over 200 games in the minors during his career.

Horne died at the age of 83 in Franklin, Ohio.

Fact
His nickname was in reference to explorer Trader Horn.

References

External links

Retrosheet

Chicago Cubs players
Jacksonville Roses players
Battle Creek Custers players
Port Huron Saints players
Saginaw Aces players
Rochester Tribe players
Jersey City Skeeters players
Los Angeles Angels (minor league) players
Indianapolis Indians players
Omaha Packers players
Scranton Miners players
Knoxville Smokies players
Oakland Oaks (baseball) players
Sacramento Senators players
Mission Reds players
Hollywood Stars players
San Diego Padres (minor league) players
Wenatchee Chiefs players
Seattle Indians players
Vancouver Maple Leafs players
Yakima Pippins players
Major League Baseball pitchers
Baseball players from Ohio
People from Montgomery County, Ohio
1899 births
1983 deaths